George Maddison may refer to:

George Maddison (footballer, born 1902) (1902–1959), English footballer
George Maddison (footballer, born 1930) (1930–1987), English footballer
George Maddison (British politician) (died 1783), joint Parliamentary Under-Secretary of State for Foreign Affairs 1782–83
George Maddison (priest) (1809–1895), Archdeacon of Ludlow from 1877 to 1892

See also
George Madison (1763–1816), Governor of Kentucky